Jeannie Aur Juju is an Indian fantasy sitcom which aired on SAB TV Monday through Friday nights. It premiered on 5 November 2012 and ended on 6 June 2014. It is adapted from the American sitcom I Dream of Jeannie. Ali Asgar plays a pilot who discovers a 2000-year-old genie, who was originally played by Giaa Manek and was later replaced by Rubina Dilaik.

Plot 
The story revolves around a pilot captain Vikram khanna aka Vicky, who finds a mysterious magical bottle on an island after his airplane crash in which he finds a most beautiful and bubbly 2000 years old Jeannie. After Jeannie enters Vicky's life, she creates lots of problems but at last Jeannie and Juju(Vicky) tackle the problem smartly and solve it. In other side, there is a modern lady who is Vicky's girlfriend Priya. Priya then hates Jeannie as she always revolve around Vicky. Then there starts a most romantic, adventurous, cute love story of Jeannie and Juju. Jeannie's sister Jiya comes to stay with them and instantly strikes a war with Vicky and created trouble for him but nevertheless both deeply cared for each other. She later goes back to jin land to complete her course. At last Juju(Vicky) finally got married with Jeannie and lived a happy married life.

Cast

Main
Giaa Manek as Jeannie (2012−2013)
Rubina Dilaik as Jeannie, Dilaik replaced Manek in 2013.
 Ali Asgar as Captain Vikram Khanna
 Harsh Khurana as Captain Virendra Lakhan Pal, known also as Vela and Velu. 
 Navina Bole as Priyanka "Priya" Seth
 Neha Mehta as Jiya, Jeannie's older sister (2013)

Recurring
 Amit Tandon as Jin Jimmy/Rahul Chaturvedi (2013)
 Kurush Deboo as Doctor Cyrus DR. (2012−2014)
 Jiten Mukhi as Pratap Seth
 Ashiesh Roy as Chatur Ganguly (2012−2014)
 Jhumma Mitra as Durga Ganguly
 Shoma Anand as Mrs Sushmita Khanna
 Muni Jha as Mr. Brij Khanna
 Daisy Irani as Veli Dadi
 Alisha Nathani as Genius
 Arishfa Khan as JhunJhun
 Karishma Tanna as Sonia/Sonu/Lambi Mirch (2014)
 Rashmi Singh as Dimpy Lakhan Pal
 Mayur Verma as Bunny Seth
 Salim Zaidi as Barfi
 Farida Jalal as Duggu Dadi (2013)
 Zahid Ali as Jin Junoon.
 Karan Godhwani as Jin Johnny (2013−2014)
 Simple Kaul as Mooni/Chand Ka Tukda/Chandni (2013−2014)
 Sukesh Anand as Jin Jagya
 Tanya Abrol as Jodha
 Vipul Roy as Jin "Jinthony" Anthony
 Puneet Vashist as Jin Joker
 Vikas Grover as Jin Jacky
 Javed Hyder as Chapri

References

External links 
 Official website
 

2012 Indian television series debuts
2014 Indian television series endings
Television about fairies and sprites
Genies in television
Indian comedy television series
Indian fantasy television series
Television about magic
Romantic fantasy television series
Sony SAB original programming
Television series set in the 2010s
Witchcraft in television
Wizards in television
Television shows based on fairy tales